Francis Rawn Shunk (August 7, 1788 – July 20, 1848) was the tenth governor of Pennsylvania from 1845 to 1848.

Early career
Shunk was born on August 7, 1788 in Trappe, Pennsylvania, to a poor farming family of German descent. His great-grandfather Simon Schunck was born in Saarland and settled in the Province of Pennsylvania. Francis R. Shunk began working on his father's farm at age 10. He continued to attend school, and by age 16 had received his qualification as a teacher and started working in the schools.

Originally a Democratic-Republican in politics, and later a Democrat, in 1812 Shunk was appointed Clerk to state Surveyor General Andrew Porter, the father of Governor David R. Porter. Shunk served in the Pennsylvania militia during the War of 1812, and took part in the 1814 defense of Baltimore.

After the war, Shunk was appointed Principal Clerk of the Pennsylvania House of Representatives.  In 1820, he married Jane Findlay, daughter of Pennsylvania Governor and Senator, William Findlay, and Pennsylvania First Lady Nancy Irwin Findlay.

From 1829 to 1839, Shunk served as Secretary of the state Canal Commission, a critical position in the government during a period when major canal, railroad and other public works projects were planned and constructed.

In 1839, Shunk was appointed Secretary of the Commonwealth, and he served until 1842.

Governor of Pennsylvania
When Democratic gubernatorial candidate Henry A. P. Muhlenberg unexpectedly died in August 1844, Shunk was selected as the party's replacement nominee. He narrowly defeated Whig candidate Joseph Markle. A large crowd attended Shunk's inaugural ceremonies, which were held during a snowstorm on January 21, 1845.

Subsequently reelected during the 1847 Pennsylvania gubernatorial election, he was compelled to retire before his second term was complete due to failing health caused by tuberculosis. He resigned on July 9, 1848, and died in Harrisburg on July 20, 1848, just eleven days after tendering his resignation. Shunk was buried at the Augustus Lutheran Church Cemetery in Trappe, Pennsylvania.

Legacy
Shunk Hall on the University Park campus of the Pennsylvania State University is named in his honor.

Shunk Street in Philadelphia is also named for him, as is Governor F.R. Shunk Avenue in Carlisle.

The village of Shunk in Fox Township, Sullivan County is also named for him.

References

External links

Francis R. Shunk at Pennsylvania Historical & Museum Commission
Francis Rawn Shunk at National Governors Association
Francis R. Shunk at Political Graveyard

1788 births
1848 deaths
People from Trappe, Pennsylvania
American Lutherans
American people of German descent
Pennsylvania Dutch people
Pennsylvania Democratic-Republicans
Democratic Party governors of Pennsylvania
Secretaries of the Commonwealth of Pennsylvania
American militiamen in the War of 1812
19th-century deaths from tuberculosis
Tuberculosis deaths in Pennsylvania
Burials in Pennsylvania
19th-century American politicians
19th-century Lutherans